Popular science (pop science) is an interpretation of science intended for a general audience.

It may also refer to:
 Science in popular culture, the occurrence of scientific topics in popular media

Magazines
 Popular Science (aka PopSci), a U.S. magazine on science, technology, and industry founded in 1872
 Popular Science Italia, the Italian edition
 Harmsworth Popular Science, a British magazine on science and technology from the turn of the 20th century 

Other uses
 Popular Science (film series) a series of short films from Paramount about science, technology and industry (1935-1950)

See also
 Antiscience
 Pseudoscience
 Politics of science
 Science outreach
 Science communication
 Science, technology and society
 Engineering (applied science)
 Technology (applied engineering)
 Industry (applied technology)
 Political Science (disambiguation)
 Popular (disambiguation)
 Science (disambiguation)